Aimo Anshelm Aaltonen (10 December 1906 – 21 September 1987) was a Finnish construction worker and politician. 
Aaltonen was born in Pargas. He became a communist as a young man and went to the Soviet Union in 1930, where he studied from 1930 to 1933 at the Communist University of the National Minorities of the West in Leningrad. Shortly after he returned to Finland, he was arrested on sedition charges and spent ten years in prison. In 1944 he was freed as a result of the Moscow Armistice of 19 September 1944, which led to the legalisation of the Communist Party of Finland (SKP). Aaltonen served as the chairman of the SKP from 1944 to 1945 and again from 1948 to 1966. He was the deputy chief of the VALPO (the Finnish Security Service) from 1945 to 1947. He was a member of the Parliament of Finland from 1945 to 1962, representing the Finnish People's Democratic League (SKDL).

References

1906 births
1987 deaths
People from Pargas
People from Turku and Pori Province (Grand Duchy of Finland)
Communist Party of Finland politicians
Finnish People's Democratic League politicians
Members of the Parliament of Finland (1945–48)
Members of the Parliament of Finland (1948–51)
Members of the Parliament of Finland (1951–54)
Members of the Parliament of Finland (1954–58)
Members of the Parliament of Finland (1958–62)
Finnish people of World War II
Prisoners and detainees of Finland
International Lenin School alumni